Driss Seghir  is a Moroccan short-story writer. He was born on May 21, 1948 in Kenitra, Morocco.

Works
Author of :
«Curse & The Blue Words» short stories 1976
«Odious Time», novel 1983
«Of Children & Homeland» short stories in 1985
«Terrifying Faces in A Terrifying Street» short stories, 1985
«Great River Concerto» novel in 1990
«Dreams Of The Beautiful Butterflies» a play in 1995
«Last-Chance Harbour» novel co-authored with Abdel Hamid El Gharbaoui in 1995
«His Excellency The Minister» short stories in 1999

Co-Author of
«A Dialogue Between Two Generations» short stories co-authored with Mohamed Said Raihani

References
«The Three Keys», An Anthology published in Arabic in Three Volumes by Mohamed Said Raihani

Moroccan writers
Moroccan male short story writers
Moroccan short story writers
Living people
1948 births